Yakima County Stadium is a baseball park in the northwest United States, located in Yakima, Washington. Opened  in 1993, it succeeded Parker Field and was the home field of the Yakima Bears minor league team for twenty seasons. It is the current home of the Yakima Valley Pippins collegiate wood-bat team of the West Coast League and has a seating capacity of 2,800.

At the northwest corner of the Central Washington State Fairgrounds, it is north of the Yakima SunDome, separated by a parking lot.

Singer Bob Dylan played the venue during his Never Ending Tour in 2010 on September 3.

In 2013, Pacific Baseball Ventures, LLC were granted ownership of the Yakima Valley Pippins baseball team of the West Coast League. In 2014, the Pippins will fund a $100,000+ renovation to the stadium.

References

External links
Little Ball Parks – Yakima County Stadium
Ballpark Reviews – Yakima County Stadium
State Fair Park – Yakima County Stadium
Stadium Journey – Yakima County Stadium

Sports venues in Washington (state)
Minor league baseball venues
Buildings and structures in Yakima, Washington
1993 establishments in Washington (state)
Sports venues completed in 1993